Ameroseius sculptilis is a species of mite in the family Ameroseiidae.

References

External links

 

Ameroseiidae
Articles created by Qbugbot
Animals described in 1916